Darby and Joan is a 1937 British drama film directed by Syd Courtenay and starring Peggy Simpson, Ian Fleming, Tod Slaughter and Mickey Brantford. The film is a quota quickie, made at Rock Studios, Elstree, for release by MGM.

Cast
 Peggy Simpson - Joan Templeton 
 Ian Fleming - Sir Ralph Ferris 
 Mickey Brantford - Yorke Ferris 
 Tod Slaughter - Mr Templeton 
 Audrene Brier - Connie 
 Pamela Bevan - Darby Templeton 
 Ella Retford - Nurse 
 Harvey Braban - Coroner

Alternate version
 As of 2018, a cropped and shortened down to 45 minutes 16 mm version entitled "She's My Darling" released in 1949 is known to still exist.

References

Bibliography
 Chibnall, Steve. Quota Quickies: The British of the British 'B' Film. British Film Institute, 2007.
 Low, Rachael. Filmmaking in 1930s Britain. George Allen & Unwin, 1985.
 Wood, Linda. British Films, 1927-1939. British Film Institute, 1986.

External links
 

1937 films
1937 drama films
British drama films
Films shot at Rock Studios
British black-and-white films
1930s English-language films
1930s British films